Volta is a Philippine television series on ABS-CBN, which was broadcast from January 26 to March 15, 2008. The series is a serialization of the 2004 film, Volta, produced by Star Cinema. It was a regional semi-finalist for the 2008 International Emmy Awards under the Comedy Program category.

This series was streaming on Jeepney TV YouTube Channel every 7:00 pm and was replaced by  Princess Sarah.

Synopsis
Volta, the Queen of Lightning kicks bad guys with her two children, 220 (Salty) and 110 (Pepper). Her husband, Mark, does not have superpowers and is unaware that his wife Perla is the superheroine Volta on whom he has a crush. The family live a complicated life of secrecy and double-secrecy as Volta tries to balance her life as a superheroine and a homemaker.

Aiding her in her complicated life are her best friends Din-Din and Nancy. Complications rise when a villainous "family" surfaces to darken Volta's days and move in on Perla's neighborhood as their next door neighbor. Will Volta ever win against her evil nemesis? Will her family find true happiness?

In the end, Volta sacrifices herself to the thunder elemental to save the world. However, before the last episode closes, a glimpse of her archenemy's hair is seen at a government cloning facility in Batangas.

Cast and characters
Ai-Ai delas Alas as Perla Magtoto/Volta
Dino Imperial as Salty/220
Mariel Pamintuan as Pepper/110
Jayson Gainza as Mark
Eugene Domingo as Nancy
Chokoleit† as Din-Din
Jackie Lou Blanco as Black Hola Hola
Carlos Morales as Incredible Hunk
DJ Durano as Anthony
Jessy Mendiola as Chappy Girl
Quintin Alianza as Ice Ice Baby
Boy Abunda as Ama

Production
The television series was adapted from the 2004 film of the same name, Volta after the movie is found to garner high ratings every time it is aired on television. Director Wenn Deramas credits Charo Santos for the idea of making the television series adaptation of the film.

Deramas said creation of the adaptation is advantageous while the film is still fresh on people’s minds saying they will see the changes in the life of the protagonist, Perla from being a maiden finding her one true love in the film to a housewife in the television series.

He insists that the series is different from the film and made some new elements to the television series. The series started with Perla, who has retired from her superheroine duties as Volta, with her husband Mark, whom she have two children, Salty and Pepper who would later be revealed to have inherited her superpowers.

Wenn introduced the Maskulado family, which serves as the antagonists of the series. The family are aliens who came from another planet who were exiled to Earth due to abusing their superpowers back at their homeworld. The director cited the Pixar animated film The Incredibles as inspiration for this decision, except stating that he made a family with superpowers as antagonists in contrast to the animated film which features a superhero family. Volta’s superhero costume was also altered to become more cosmopolitan and modern.

Volta theme song
Vincent de Jesus - original theme and musical score

See also
List of programs previously aired by ABS-CBN
Volta

References

External links
 Boy Abunda, the King of Talk official website

ABS-CBN original programming
Philippine comedy television series
Fantaserye and telefantasya
Philippine science fiction television series
Superhero television series
2008 Philippine television series debuts
2008 Philippine television series endings
Live action television shows based on films
Television series by Star Creatives
Filipino-language television shows